The discography of South Korean girl group Wonder Girls, consists of three studio albums, four extended plays, one single album, two greatest hits albums and eighteen singles.

Albums

Studio albums

Compilation albums

Single albums

Extended plays

Singles

Promotional singles

Other charted songs

Unreleased songs
 "Ouch"
 "Stay Together"
 "Wake Up"

Other appearances

Music videos

Notes

References 

Discography
Discographies of South Korean artists
K-pop music group discographies